South Pacific Air Lines (SPAL) was an airline headquartered in the Financial District of San Francisco, California. The airline began service between Honolulu and Tahiti on April 2, 1960. In 1963 its fleet consisted of two Lockheed L-1049 Super Constellation propliners.

According to its May 16, 1962 system timetable, the airline was operating two routes:  Honolulu - Papeete, Tahiti with one round trip nonstop flight a week and Honolulu - Pago Pago - Papeete, Tahiti also flown round trip once a week with both services being operated with L-1049 Super Constellation aircraft.

See also 
 List of defunct airlines of the United States

References

Defunct airlines of the United States
Companies based in San Francisco